How It Ends may refer to:
 How It Ends (album), a 2004 album by DeVotchKa, or the title track
 How It Ends (2018 film), an action film
 How It Ends (2021 film), a drama film
 "How It Ends", a song by Finneas from his 2021 album Optimist